Sourn Serey Ratha (born September 7, 1973) is a Cambodian American republican politician, and the founder and President of the Khmer Power Party (KPP).

He was convicted of inciting military personnel disobedience and demoralising the army based on a message he posted on Facebook urging the Royal Cambodian Armed Forces to resist orders from their leaders.  He was sentenced to five years in prison but was granted a royal pardon by King Norodom Sihamoni after serving just over a year.  He was also fined $2,500.

References

1973 births
Living people
Boston University alumni
Cambodian anti-communists
Cambodian democracy activists
Cambodian emigrants to the United States
Cambodian nationalists
Cambodian republicans
Georgetown University alumni
People from Battambang province